Logobi GT later just La GT is a popular Logobi musical act in France, and one of the pioneers in making this genre of music from the continent of Africa popular in continental Europe. The group is signed to Five Music label and features Sisi-K on vocals with 4 dancers all originating from Africa and the Caribbean.

Members
Logobi GT comes mainly from the Boullereaux, suburb of Champigny-sur-Marne and is composed of:
Sisi-K - vocals - Central African Republic
Cézar - dancer - Congo
Lassio Gabana- dancer - Ivory Coast
Norton - dancer - Congo
Sylja - dancer - Guadeloupe
Jordane - Terrasse - rhythm

Earlier members
Jojo - dancer - Cape Verde
Lyas - dancer - Cape Verde

Discography

Albums

EPs

Singles

Featured in

References

External links
Facebook
YouTube
Skyrock

French musical groups